Miika Huhtanen (born 23 July 1993) is a Finnish professional ice hockey player. He is currently playing for Hermes of the Finnish Mestis.

Huhtanen made his Liiga debut playing with SaiPa during the 2013-14 Liiga season.

References

External links

1993 births
Living people
SaiPa players
Kokkolan Hermes players
KeuPa HT players
Finnish ice hockey defencemen
People from Lappeenranta
Sportspeople from South Karelia